Duniya ( 'World') is a 2007 Indian Kannada-language film written and directed by Soori. It was successful with both critics and audience.

Plot
Shivlingu a.k.a. Shivu, an innocent villager who works as a manual laborer in stone quarry realizes that his mother is seriously ill. He gets his mother to Bangalore for treatment, but his mother dies and he is unable to arrange finances for her funeral. He manages to pay with the only ornament he had in order to carry out the funeral of his mother. With his inability to procure a tomb-stone for his mother's grave, Shivu leaves the city walking without any money, devastated.

While on his way he comes across a girl (Purnima) who is kidnapped and the abductors try to rape her. Shivu saves her and gets her to the orphanage where she is staying. The warden of the institute misunderstands the situation and believes that Purnima is in love with Shivu and had eloped with him. The warden asks the girl to leave the institution immediately.

Shivu wants to fulfill her wish to continue study and decides to support her education. But apart from a strong body he does not have any qualities to survive in this world. The circumstances make him work for the underworld. In the process his peers in the underworld have an eye on Purima, the love for Purnima makes Shivu to fight with mob leaders. In the process the kingpin is killed. Police wrongly believe that Shivu is responsible for the murders. Unable to see the suffering of Shivu at the hands of society, police, and the underworld, Purnima calls him to meet her outside the city. Without his knowledge, she gives him sweets laced with poison and she too consumes the same to end the chapter.

Cast

 Vijay as Shivlingu or Shivu
 Rashmi as Poornima
 Rangayana Raghu as Satyanna
 Kishore as ACP Umesh Kumar 
 Mico Nagaraj as Raghupathi
 Vasudha Barighate
 Mahesh
 Lokesh as Praveen
 Sai Sunil as Sappe 
 Prasanna as Petrol 
 Mithra
 Yogesh as Maadha
 Balu Nagendra
Kaddipudi Chandru as Dopu
Anil 
Raghava Uday 
Ambujakshi 
Madhugiri Prakash 
Umesh Punga 
Venkata Rao

Music
The soundtrack for Duniya has music composed by V. Manohar. Lyrics are by V. Nagendra Prasad, V. Manohar and Yograj Bhat.

Reception 
A critic from Rediff.com said that "This is Vijay's first film as the hero but he has certainly proved that he has oodles of talent.  His performance is one of the best seen in recent times. Rashmi is the real find of this film. Duniya is a must see".

Box office
It has completed 150-days and became commercially successful at the box office.

Awards
2006–2007: Karnataka State Film Awards
Best Actor: Vijay
Best Screenplay: Soori
Best Supporting Actor: Rangayana Raghu
Best Female Playback Singer: M. D. Pallavi Arun

References

External links
 
 Duniya, web site
 'Mungaru Male' & 'Duniya' sweep State Awards IndiaGlitz, 23 July 2007.

2007 films
Films scored by V. Manohar
Indian crime drama films
Indian gangster films
2007 crime drama films
Films about organised crime in India
Films set in Bangalore
Films shot in Bangalore
Films directed by Duniya Soori
2007 directorial debut films
2000s Kannada-language films